The Zumsteinspitze (Punta Zumstein in Italian) (4,563 m) is a peak in the Pennine Alps on the border between Italy and Switzerland. It is a subpeak of Monte Rosa.

The summit lies between the Dufourspitze (to which it is joined by the Grenzsattel) and the Signalkuppe (to which it is joined  by the Colle Gnifetti).

Climbing
On 1 August 1820 the mountain was ascended by the brothers Joseph and Johann Niklaus Vincent, Joseph Zumstein, Molinatti, Castel and some unknown porters. During the expedition they thought they had climbed the highest peak of the Monte Rosa massif, but when they reached the summit they found out there was another "highest peak": the Dufourspitze. 
The Vincent brothers and Zumstein agreed to name the successfully climbed mountain "Cima de la belle Alliance", but Zumstein, forest inspector and member of the Royal Society of Science in Turin, managed to name the mountain after himself.

The first winter ascent was by E. Allegra and guides on 30 March 1902.

See also

List of Alpine four-thousanders
List of mountains of Switzerland named after people

References
 Robin G. Collomb, (ed.), Pennine Alps Central, London: Alpine Club, 1975
 Helmut Dumler and Willi P. Burkhardt, The High Mountains of the Alps, London: Diadem, 1994
 Julius Kugy, Im göttlichen Lächeln des Monte Rosa, Graz: Leykam-Verlag, 1940

External links
 The Zumsteinspitze on SummitPost
 360° panorama from Zumsteinspitze

Mountains of the Alps
Alpine four-thousanders
Mountains of Piedmont
Mountains of Valais
Pennine Alps
Italy–Switzerland border
International mountains of Europe
Monte Rosa
Mountains of Switzerland
Four-thousanders of Switzerland